Elfriede Jaksch (1842–1897) was a German-language Latvian author. She wrote a number of popular novels and novellas under the pen name Shack von Igar.

References
 BBLD – Baltisches biografisches Lexikon digital

1842 births
1897 deaths
19th-century Latvian people
Baltic-German people
Latvian novelists
Latvian women writers
19th-century novelists
19th-century Latvian women writers
19th-century Latvian writers